Josh Meekings (born 2 September 1992) is an English professional footballer and coach, who plays as a central defender, and currently is a player-assistant manager for Highland Football League club Brora Rangers. Meekings has previously played for Ipswich Town, Inverness Caledonian Thistle, Dundee, and Wealdstone.

Career

Ipswich Town
Meekings was born in Bury St Edmunds, England and raised in Suffolk. As a youth, he captained the under-18s at Ipswich Town. However, in the summer of 2011 he was released by the club without having played for the first-team.

Inverness Caledonian Thistle
Meekings was due to sign a deal with Stevenage but the deal fell through and instead, on 4 July 2011 he agreed to join Inverness Caledonian Thistle on a two-year deal. Shortly after moving to Inverness, Meekings revealed that the prospect of developing under manager Terry Butcher was influential in his decision to sign.

After months of being an unused substitute for Inverness following his recovery from ankle ligament damage, Meekings made his debut after coming on for Thomas Piermayr in the 66th minute during a 1–1 draw against Dunfermline Athletic on 22 October 2011. Two weeks later on 5 November 2011, he provided the 'assist' for Grégory Tadé to score – to make 3–1 – against Kilmarnock, the match ending with Inverness winning 6–3. On 24 March 2012, Meekings received a red card for the first time in his career after a second bookable offence in a 1–0 win over Aberdeen.

At the start of the 2012–13 season, Meekings become a regular starter for the club, playing in either central defence or right-back. Ultimately, he settled into a regular, central pairing with Gary Warren. On 31 October 2012, Meekings was in the team that beat Rangers 3–0 away, in the quarter-final of the 2012–13 Scottish League Cup. He also played in the team that beat Celtic 1–0 away, the following month. On 15 December 2012, he scored an own goal in a 4–4 draw against Dundee United. Nevertheless, a few days later, Meekings along with Graeme Shinnie, signed two-year contract extensions, keeping them at the club until 2015, as Terry Butcher demonstrated his desire to keep the squad intact. Meekings' excellent season and consistent form was recognised with the award of SPL Young Player of the Month for March 2013. Weeks later on 4 May 2013, Meekings provided a double assist for Billy Mckay, who later scored a hat-trick, in a 4–3 win over Motherwell, to keep alive hopes of earning a spot in the UEFA Europa League next season.

In the 2013–14 season, Meekings continued as a regular starter for the club, playing in central defense most of the season and occasionally playing as a right-back. Despite being sent off in the semi-final of the Scottish League Cup, Meekings was cleared to play in the final after a successful appeal. However, Inverness lost the match against Aberdeen, on penalties. Two weeks later on 29 March 2014, Meekings was sent-off in the 68th minute for a foul on Josh Magennis, in a 2–2 draw against St Mirren. After serving a one-game suspension, he featured in three more matches before being sidelined for the rest of the season.

In the 2014–15 season, Meekings started the season well when he scored the first goal of his career in September 2014, heading the opening goal for Inverness, in a 3–2 defeat by Aberdeen. On 8 November 2014, he made his 100th league appearance for the club in a 4–2 win over Hamilton Accies. Meekings scored two weeks later on 22 November 2014, in a 3–1 win over Motherwell and scored seven days later, in the fourth round of the Scottish Cup, in a 1–1 draw against St Mirren, leading to a replay. Despite interest from Peterborough United, it was announced on 12 February 2015, that he had signed an extension to his contract, agreeing to remain with Inverness until the summer of 2017. Meekings became the subject of much national and international interest in the aftermath of ICT's Scottish Cup semi-final win against Celtic. During the game, television pictures and replays clearly showed that he 'handled' the ball in the penalty area, preventing a certain goal – however, the incident was 'missed' by the match officials. In an unprecedented move, Meekings was retrospectively cited by the SFA's Compliance Officer to face a charge of 'preventing a goal-scoring opportunity by deliberately handling the ball'. He was offered a one-match-ban, but Inverness contested this and a date was set for the case to be heard. On the day of the hearing, it transpired that he should not actually have been cited, as the referee had subsequently confirmed that he had indeed seen the 'incident' but not the alleged 'offence'. As a result, the case did not proceed and the charge against Meekings was dropped, with the SFA confirming that he would be eligible to play in the cup final. Following this, Celtic Manager Ronny Deila believed Meekings deserved to play in the final, while Meekings, himself, said he was lucky to avoid suspension and credited Manager John Hughes for helping avoid global headlines. In the build up to the Scottish Cup final, Meeking scored his third goal of the season and set up another, in a 3–0 win over Dundee United on 16 May 2015. Meekings started and played in Scottish Cup Final, which Inverness won 2–1 against Falkirk.

In the 2015–16 season, Meekings played in both legs of the second qualifying round in the Europa League, as Inverness CT lose 1–0 on aggregate against Astra Giurgiu. However, he was soon sidelined after suffering a knee injury in the opening game of the season against Motherwell and was substituted at half time. He continued to struggle with injury and left Inverness after the 2016–17 season.

Dundee
Having rehabilitated from injury with Dundee, Meekings signed a one-year contract with the club in August 2017. After featuring throughout the first half of the season, Meekings suffered various injuries throughout the latter half. Despite this, Meekings signed a two-year contract extension in March 2018. Unfortunately, injuries would continue to plague him, with a hip injury he received in September effectively ending his season when it was declared it needed to be operated on in November.

Now in the Championship with Dundee, the now injury-free Meekings struggled to find playing time for the first half of the season. The team captain eventually gained a starting spot in December, and would eventually form an effective partnership with Christophe Berra and Jordon Forster that would keep 5 consecutive clean sheets. This positive momentum was however abruptly cut short due to the COVID-19 pandemic, which would curtail the remainder of the season. In May, Dundee announced they would extend the contracts of players whose contracts were to expire, including Meekings, the following month to July.

Meekings left Dundee in June 2020 after rejecting a contract extension.

Wealdstone
In January 2021, Meekings signed for National League side Wealdstone. He made his debut on 18 January, playing the full 90 minutes in a 3-1 victory over Gloucester City in the FA Trophy. Meekings' time at Wealdstone was heavily disrupted by injury, and he departed the club at the end of the season after only 4 appearances.

Brora Rangers 
In June 2021, Meekings made his return to the Highlands after signing a three-year deal with Highland League side Brora Rangers. In September, Meekings was added to the Cattachs' management team as a coach under new manager Craig Campbell, pending completing his qualification. Meekings would win the Highland League Cup with Brora in April 2022. Meekings would get his second trophy as a player/coach with Brora later that year as the Cattachs won the North of Scotland Cup in October.

In February 2023, Meekings was named as player-assistant manager for Brora Rangers under new manager Ally MacDonald.

Career statistics

Honours
Inverness Caledonian Thistle
Scottish Cup: 2014–15

Brora Rangers

 Highland League Cup: 2021–22
 North of Scotland Cup: 2022–23

Individual
 SPL Young Player of the Month: March 2013

References

1992 births
Living people
English footballers
Inverness Caledonian Thistle F.C. players
Scottish Premier League players
Sportspeople from Bury St Edmunds
Ipswich Town F.C. players
Association football defenders
Scottish Professional Football League players
Highland Football League players
Dundee F.C. players
Wealdstone F.C. players
Brora Rangers F.C. players